Main Tera Dushman is a 1989 Indian film directed by Vijay Reddy. The movie stars Jackie Shroff and Jaya Prada. Sunny Deol and Sridevi are in a special appearance. The film was a flop at the box office.

Cast
 Jackie Shroff... Kishan Srivastav
 Jaya Prada... Jaya
 Sunny Deol... Gopal (special appearance)
 Sridevi... Jugni (special appearance)
 Rajesh Khanna... Shankar truck driver (special appearance)
 Jagdeep... Truck cleaner (special appearance)
 Kiran Kumar... Inspector Kiran Kumar
 Kulbhushan Kharbanda... Jwalaprasad (Jugni's father)
 Anupam Kher... Thakur Dayalu
 Tej Sapru... Kaalu, Daayalu's assistant 
 Rakesh Bedi... Forest Constable Chustiram
 Rajendra Nath... Forest Constable Dukhiram
 Mac Mohan... Forest police Constable Dhaniram

Plot
Honest and diligent  Forest Officer Kishan Srivastav (Shroff) and his wife Jaya (Pradha) come to the rural area of Ramgarh, and upset the criminal activities of Thakur Dayalu (Kher), a corrupt police inspector, Kiran Kumar (Kumar) and their cronies. These activities includes the capture and death of wildlife, so that Dayalu can decorate his palatial home. As Kishan attempts to disrupt their criminal enterprise, he finds that Dayalu Singh has by-passed him and complained to his superiors, thereby getting him dismissed from employment and being framed and imprisoned for a murder. Dayalu has not only got away with murder, but has also killed Gopal (Deol) in the presence of his to-be bride, Jugni (Sridevi), making her lose her sanity. Dayalu frames Jugni's dad, Jwalaprasad (Kharbanda) for the murder of Gopal.

With Jaya all by herself, Dayalu turn his lustful eyes on her, but just at the right moment, Ramu, a baby elephant comes to her rescue and fights with the Thakur. When Kishan is jailed for seven years, his wife Jaya faints in the court and falls sick. Her son and Ramu the elephant take care of her, doing a street play to earn money for her medicines. Kishan escapes from jail with the help of Ramu the elephant, who packs his favorite boots for him. Ramu helps the family flee from the clutches of Thakur and his crony policemen.

While the family is hiding in the jungle, the son starts feeling hungry. Ramu goes near a temple and starts blessing women, who give him money. With this money, he buys bread for the family. Inspector Kiran Kumar sees this and follows Ramu the elephant into the jungle. Kiran finds the family and prepares to shoot Kishan; however, Ramu snatches the gun from him using his trunk. Together Kishan and Ramu fight off the policemen. Ramu eventually kills Kiran by trampling him. Meanwhile, Jwalaprasad is released from jail, only to find out that Jugni has escaped from the asylum. Jwalaprasad finds her in front of a temple, with perfect makeup, where she refuses to recognize him. Jugni is still under the perception that she is going to get married. Jwalaprasad managed to corner Thakur's men and tries to fight them alone. The men throw him into a swamp, but Kishan comes at the right time to save him, and Ramu the elephant pulls Jwalaprasad out of the swamp. Thakur's chief goon into the swamp making Thakur very angry. His men manage to shoot the sole witness to Kishan's innocence. Kishan takes this man to the hospital and threatens a doctor in order to save the witness.

Thakur has an epiphany that he is going to die, and in order to protect himself, he goes back to abduct Jaya, and kills a villager in the process. Jugni is reminded of the tragedy she faced and faints. Jwalaprasad informs Kishan that his wife has been abducted and both of them go to fight Thakur in his palatial house. They are both captured. Jugni arrives there, calling Dayalu Thakur her father, who tells her that he himself is Jugni's fiancée. Jugni then dresses up, and starts dancing in an attempt to fool him. Jugni, revealing her fighting skills, manages to release all three captives. Amidst this fight she is shot. Thakur manages to escape the drama, but Kishan, Jugni and Ramu the elephant catch up with him. Jugni kills Thakur and avenges Gopal's death. Ramu the elephant also remembers that Thakur had killed his mom and tramples Thakur. Jugni eventually dies from her injuries. Ramu the elephant implores the audience to save animals.

Soundtrack
Lyricist: Indeevar

External links
 

1989 films
1980s Hindi-language films
Films scored by Laxmikant–Pyarelal